Journey to a Star or A Journey to a Star is a song composed by Harry Warren with lyrics by Leo Robin introduced by Alice Faye in the 1943 film The Gang's All Here. It was a charted recording in 1944 by Judy Garland.

References

1944 songs
Judy Garland songs
Songs with lyrics by Leo Robin
Songs with music by Harry Warren